In enzymology, a glycosaminoglycan galactosyltransferase is an enzyme that catalyzes the chemical reaction

UDP-galactose + glycosaminoglycan  UDP + D-galactosylglycosaminoglycan

Thus, the two substrates of this enzyme are UDP-galactose and glycosaminoglycan, whereas its two products are UDP and D-galactosylglycosaminoglycan.

This enzyme belongs to the family of glycosyltransferases, specifically the hexosyltransferases.  The systematic name of this enzyme class is UDP-galactose:glycosaminoglycan D-galactosyltransferase. This enzyme is also called uridine diphosphogalactose-mucopolysaccharide galactosyltransferase.

References

 

EC 2.4.1
Enzymes of unknown structure